John Baron, D.D. (31 October 167711 July 1739) was an Anglican priest in the eighteenth century.

Bullock was educated at Pembroke College, Cambridge. He held livings at Brome, Chedgrave and Saxlingham. He was Archdeacon of Norfolk from 1731 to 1733; and Dean of Norwich from 1733 until his death.

Notes

18th-century English Anglican priests
Archdeacons of Norfolk
Deans of Norwich
1677 births
1739 deaths
Alumni of Pembroke College, Cambridge